Bastilla dentilinea  is a moth of the family Noctuidae first described by George Thomas Bethune-Baker in 1906. It is found in New Guinea.

References

Bastilla (moth)
Moths described in 1906